Mark Oberman (born 24 September 1967) is an Australian water polo player who competed in the 1992 Summer Olympics and in the 2000 Summer Olympics.

References

External links
 

1967 births
Living people
Australian male water polo players
Olympic water polo players of Australia
Water polo players at the 1992 Summer Olympics
Water polo players at the 2000 Summer Olympics